Colobonema is a genus of deep-sea hydrozoans.

Species
There are three species:
 Colobonema apicatum Russell, 1961
 Colobonema igneum (Vanhöffen, 1902)
 Colobonema sericeum Vanhöffen, 1902

References

Rhopalonematidae
Hydrozoan genera
Bioluminescent cnidarians